Bárbara Rocío Comba (born 14 July 1987) is an Argentine discus thrower.

She was born in Río Tercero. As a teenager she competed in the shot put, and finished tenth at the 2003 World Youth Championships and eighth at the 2006 World Junior Championships. Her personal best throw is 16.59 metres, achieved in July 2006 in São Caetano do Sul.

In the discus throw she finished fifth at the 2006 World Junior Championships. She also competed at the 2008, 2012 and 2016 Olympic Games and the 2009 and 2015 World Championships without reaching the final.  She did, however, reach the finals of the 2013 World Championship in Moscow.

Her personal best is 62.77 metres, achieved in May 2013 in Belém, Brazil.

Personal bests
Shot put: 16.59 m –  São Caetano do Sul, 22 July 2006
Discus throw: 62.77 m –  Belém, 12 May 2013
Hammer throw: 49.88 m –  Rosario, 2 October 2005

Competition record

References

External links
 
 
 
 
 

1987 births
Living people
Argentine female shot putters
Argentine female discus throwers
Olympic athletes of Argentina
Athletes (track and field) at the 2008 Summer Olympics
Athletes (track and field) at the 2012 Summer Olympics
Athletes (track and field) at the 2016 Summer Olympics
Pan American Games competitors for Argentina
Athletes (track and field) at the 2007 Pan American Games
Athletes (track and field) at the 2011 Pan American Games
Athletes (track and field) at the 2015 Pan American Games
South American Games silver medalists for Argentina
South American Games medalists in athletics
Competitors at the 2006 South American Games
Competitors at the 2014 South American Games
World Athletics Championships athletes for Argentina
Sportspeople from Córdoba Province, Argentina
21st-century Argentine women